Desmiphorini is a tribe of longhorn beetles of the subfamily Lamiinae.

Taxonomy
Desmiphorini contains the following genera:

 Aconopteroides Breuning, 1959
 Aconopterus Blanchard in Gay, 1851
 Adjinga Pic, 1926
 Alice Ślipiński & Escalona, 2013
 Alloblabia Galileo, Santos-Silva & Bezark, 2017
 Allotigrinestola Heffern & Santos-Silva, 2017
 Amblymora Pascoe, 1867
 Amblymoropsis Breuning, 1958
 Amymoma Pascoe, 1866
 Anacasta Aurivillius, 1916
 Anaespogonius Gressitt, 1938
 Anaesthetis Dejean, 1835
 Anaesthetobrium Pic, 1923
 Anisopeplus Melzer, 1935
 Aphronastes Fairmaire, 1896
 Apodasya Pascoe, 1863
 Aragea Hayashi, 1953
 Arhopaloscelis Murzin, Danilevsky & Lobanov, 1981
 Asaperdina Breuning, 1975
 Atelodesmis Chevrolat, 1841
 Atimiliopsis Breuning, 1974
 Atimiola Bates, 1880
 Baraeomimus Breuning, 1973
 Belodasys Breuning, 1954
 Beloderoides Breuning, 1940
 Blabia Thomson, 1864
 Blabicentrus Bates, 1866
 Bonipogonius Kusama, 1974
 Bucynthia Pascoe, 1866
 Bulborhodopis Breuning, 1948
 Caledoamblymora Sudre & Mille, 2013
 Callapoecus Bates, 1884
 Capillicornis Galileo & Martins, 2012
 Catognatha Blanchard in Gay, 1851
 Ceiupaba Martins & Galileo, 1998
 Cervoglenea Gressitt, 1951
 Chaetacanthidius Gilmour, 1948
 Cicatrisestola Breuning, 1947
 Cicatrisestoloides Breuning & Heyrovsky, 1964
 Cicuiara Galileo & Martins, 1996
 Cleidaria Nascimento & Santos-Silva, 2020
 Clermontia Pic, 1927
 Clytosemia Bates, 1884
 Coeloprocta Aurivillius, 1926
 Cotyschnolea Martins & Galileo, 2007
 Crinotarsus Blanchard, 1853
 Cristatosybra Breuning, 1959
 Cristorhodopina Breuning, 1966
 Curuapira Martins & Galileo, 1998
 Cylindilla Bates, 1884
 Cymatonycha Bates, 1874
 Cyocyphax Thomson, 1878
 Deroplia Dejean, 1835
 Desmiphora Audinet-Serville, 1835
 Diadelia Waterhouse, 1882
 Diadelioides Breuning, 1940
 Didymocentrotus McKeown, 1945
 Diliolophus Bates, 1885
 Disgregus Galileo & Martins, 2009
 Dolichestola Breuning, 1942
 Dorcaschesis Heller, 1924
 Dysthaeta Pascoe, 1859
 Ectatina Gahan, 1907
 Ectatosia Pascoe, 1857
 Epicasta Thomson, 1864
 Esaguasu Galileo & Martins, 2007
 Essisus Pascoe, 1866
 Estola Fairmaire & Germain, 1859
 Estoloides Breuning, 1940
 Estolomimus Breuning, 1940
 Etyma Galileo & Martins, 2012
 Euestola Breuning, 1943
 Eugrapheus Fairmaire, 1896
 Eupogoniopsis Breuning, 1949
 Eupogonius LeConte, 1852
 Euseboides Gahan, 1893
 Fallaxdesmis Santos-Silva & Wappes, 2018
 Falsadjinga Breuning, 1959
 Falsamblymora Breuning, 1959
 Falsapomecyna Breuning, 1942
 Falsatimura Pic, 1926
 Falsohyagnis Breuning, 1940
 Falsorsidis Breuning, 1959
 Falsoserixia Pic, 1926
 Falsostesilea Breuning, 1940
 Falsoterinaea Matsushita, 1938
 Falsovelleda Breuning, 1954
 Falsozeargyra Gilmour & Breuning, 1963
 Gibbestola Breuning, 1940
 Gibbestoloides Breuning, 1940
 Graphidessa Bates, 1884
 Gyrpanetes Martins & Galileo, 1998
 Hallothamus Thomson, 1868
 Heteresmia Monné, 2005
 Hoplorana Fairmaire, 1896
 Ibypeba Martins & Galileo, 2012
 Icublabia Galileo & Martins, 2003
 Illaena Erichson, 1842
 Inermaegocidnus Breuning, 1961
 Inermestola Breuning, 1942
 Inermestoloides Breuning, 1966
 Iphiothe Pascoe, 1866
 Ipochiromima Sama & Sudre, 2009
 Ischnolea Thomson, 1861
 Ischnoleomimus Breuning, 1940
 Iurubanga Martins & Galileo, 1996
 Jolyellus Galileo & Martins, 2007
 Kerodiadelia Sudre & Teocchi, 2002
 Lamiessa Bates, 1885
 Languriomiccolamia Matsuo & Yamasako, 2011
 Laoterinaea Breuning, 1965
 Malthonea Thomson, 1864
 Maublancancylistes Lepesme & Breuning, 1956
 Mesotroea Breuning, 1939
 Metallographeus Breuning, 1971
 Metasulenus Breuning, 1971
 Meton Pascoe, 1862
 Miccolamia Bates, 1884
 Micratelodesmis Martins & Galileo, 2012
 Microestola Gressitt, 1940
 Microrhodopina Breuning, 1982
 Microrhodopis Breuning, 1957
 Mimacalolepta Breuning, 1976
 Mimacartus Sudre & Delatour, 2019
 Mimadjinga Breuning, 1940
 Mimalblymoroides Breuning, 1969
 Mimancylistes Breuning, 1955
 Mimapatelarthron Breuning, 1940
 Mimasyngenes Breuning, 1950
 Mimauxa Breuning, 1980
 Mimectatina Aurivillius, 1927
 Mimeremon Breuning, 1967
 Mimestola Breuning, 1940
 Mimeuseboides Breuning, 1967
 Mimillaena Breuning, 1958
 Mimipochira Breuning, 1956
 Mimocentrura Breuning, 1940
 Mimodiadelia Breuning, 1971
 Mimodystasia Breuning, 1956
 Mimogmodera Breuning, 1955
 Mimogyaritus Fisher, 1925
 Mimohomonoea Breuning, 1961
 Mimolophia Breuning, 1940
 Mimomorpha Newman, 1842
 Mimomulciber Breuning, 1942
 Mimopogonius Breuning, 1974
 Mimoscapeuseboides Breuning, 1976
 Mimosciadella Breuning, 1958
 Mimoserixia Breuning, 1963
 Mimostedes Breuning, 1955
 Mimostenellipsis Breuning, 1956
 Mimothelais Breuning, 1958
 Mimotroea Breuning, 1939
 Mimovitalisia Breuning, 1959
 Mimozotale Breuning, 1951
 Monnetyra Galileo & Martins, 2006
 Murupi Martins & Galileo, 1998
 Mynonebra Pascoe, 1864
 Myonebrides Breuning, 1957
 Nedine Thomson, 1864
 Neissa Pascoe, 1866
 Neocolobura Monné, 2005
 Neodiadelia Breuning, 1956
 Neoepaphra Fisher, 1935
 Nepagyrtes Martins & Galileo, 1998
 Nicarete Thomson, 1864
 Nonyma Pascoe, 1864
 Nyoma Duvivier, 1892
 Obscenoides Nascimento & Santos-Silva, 2020
 Ocularoleiopus Sudre, Jiroux & Vitali, 2018
 Oiceaca Martins & Galileo, 1998
 Oricopis Pascoe, 1863
 Othelais Pascoe, 1866
 Otroea Pascoe, 1866
 Otroeopsis Breuning, 1939
 Panegyrtes Thomson, 1868
 Parablabicentrus Dalens, Touroult & Tavakilian, 2009
 Paradesmiphora Breuning, 1959
 Paradjinga Breuning, 1970
 Paramblymora Breuning, 1961
 Paranaesthetis Breuning, 1982
 Paraphronastes Breuning, 1980
 Pararhopaloscelides Breuning, 1947
 Parasalvazaon Breuning, 1958
 Parasophronica Breuning, 1940
 Parasophroniella Breuning, 1943
 Parasulenus Breuning, 1957
 Paratimiola Breuning, 1965
 Parectatina Breuning, 1959
 Parectatosia Breuning, 1940
 Paressisus Aurivillius, 1917
 Parestola Bates, 1880
 Pareuseboides Breuning, 1948
 Parischnolea Breuning, 1942
 Paroectropsis Cerda, 1954
 Paroricopis Breuning, 1958
 Parothelais Breuning, 1948
 Pentacosmia Newman, 1842
 Penthides Matsushita, 1933
 Philicus Pascoe, 1883
 Phlyarus Pascoe, 1858
 Phyxium Pascoe, 1864
 Piimuna Martins & Galileo, 1998
 Pilomecyna Breuning, 1940
 Piruauna Galileo & Martins, 1998
 Pithomictus Pascoe, 1864
 Pogonillus Bates, 1885
 Probatodes Thomson, 1864
 Proparasophronica Sama & Sudre, 2009
 Protumida Monné & Wappes, 2014
 Psenocerus LeConte, 1852
 Pseudanaesthetis Pic, 1922
 Pseudectatosia Breuning, 1940
 Pseudepaphra Breuning, 1956
 Pseudestola Breuning, 1940
 Pseudestoloides Breuning & Heyrovsky, 1961
 Pseudeuseboides Breuning, 1968
 Pseudischnolea Breuning, 1953
 Pseudocentruropsis Breuning, 1961
 Pseudonicarete Breuning, 1980
 Pseudorhodopis Breuning, 1940
 Pseudoricopis Breuning, 1970
 Pseudoropica Breuning, 1968
 Pseudosophronica Breuning, 1978
 Pseudostyne Breuning, 1940
 Pseudosybrinus Adlbauer, 2021
 Pseudoterinaea Breuning, 1940
 Ptericoptomimus Melzer, 1935
†Pterolophosoma Vitali, 2006
 Pterolophioides Breuning, 1942
 Pygmaeopsis Schaeffer, 1908
 Quasimesosella Miroshnikov, 2006
 Retilla Lacordaire, 1872
 Rhodopina Gressitt, 1951
 Rhopaloscelis Blessig, 1873
 Rileyellus Wappes & Santos-Silva, 2020
 Rosalbopsis Galileo & Santos-Silva, 2017
 Rufosophronica Breuning, 1971
 Rufulosophronica Breuning, 1960
 Salvazaon Pic, 1928
 Scapeuseboides Breuning, 1958
 Scaposerixia Breuning, 1975
 Serixiomimus Breuning, 1966
 Similonedine Hua, 1993
 Sophronica Blanchard, 1845
 Sophronicoides Breuning, 1986
 Sophronisca Aurivillius, 1910
 Sormida Gahan, 1888
 Sormidomorpha Aurivillius, 1920
 Soupha Breuning, 1963
 Sphigmothorax Gressitt, 1939
 Spinestoloides Breuning, 1954
 Spineugrapheus Breuning, 1964
 Spinosophronica Breuning, 1948
 Spinosophroniella Breuning, 1961
 Spinosophronisca Breuning, 1962
 Spinozorilispe Breuning, 1963
 Stenideogmodera Sudre & Delatour, 2019
 Stenocentrura Breuning, 1948
 Stereomerus Melzer, 1935
 Striatanaesthetis Breuning, 1957
 Sulenopsis Breuning, 1957
 Sybrinus Gahan, 1900
 Sybrocentrura Breuning, 1947
 Sybrodoius Breuning, 1957
 Sydonia Thomson, 1864
 Taelosilla Thomson, 1868
 Taiwanajinga Hayashi, 1978
 Temnolamia Breuning, 1961
 Terinaea Bates, 1884
 Tesapeus Galileo & Martins, 2012
 Tetroreopsis Breuning, 1940
 Thereselia Pic, 1944
 Tigrinestola Breuning, 1949
 Trichadjinga Breuning, 1975
 Trichestola Breuning, 1950
 Trichoserixia Breuning, 1965
 Trichosophroniella Breuning, 1959
 Trichostenidea Breuning, 1948
 Trichostenideus Teocchi & Sudre, 2009
 Trichotroea Breuning, 1956
 Unelcus Thomson, 1864
 Ussurella Danilevsky, 1997
 Velora Thomson, 1864
 Veloroides Breuning, 1956
 Veloropsis Breuning, 1969
 Vittatopothyne Breuning, 1968
 Wappesellus Martins, Santos-Silva & Galileo, 2015
 Zorilispiella Breuning, 1959
 Zotalemimon Pic, 1925

References

 
Lamiinae
Beetle tribes